The list below consists of the reasons delivered from the bench by the Supreme Court of Canada during 1995. This list, however, does not include decisions on motions.

Reasons

References
1995 decisions: CanLII

Reasons Of The Supreme Court Of Canada, 1995
Supreme Court of Canada reasons by year